Tartu Ski Marathon is a long-distance cross-country skiing competition, held annually in Estonia, on third Sunday of February. It debuted in 1960 and has been a part of Worldloppet since 1994.

Initially, the track stretched from Tartu to Kääriku, partially on the Emajõgi river ice. For years the marathon's start was given in Matu (in Aakre) with the finish in Elva. Nowadays, the full 63 km marathon track stretches from Otepää to Elva.

The event is part of the Worldloppet events, and places itself among the biggest ski races in the world with nearly 12,000 participants in its peak years.

References

External links

Skiing in Estonia
International sports competitions hosted by Estonia
Cross-country skiing competitions
1960 establishments in Estonia
Sport in Tartu
Otepää Parish
Elva Parish
Recurring sporting events established in 1960
February sporting events
Ski marathons
Winter events in Estonia